The Journal of the American Pharmacists Association is a bimonthly peer-reviewed medical journal covering pharmacy-related topics. It was established in 1912,  published as Journal of the American Pharmaceutical Association with slightly varying title until  1977,  as American Pharmacist  (1978 – 1996), then again as the Journal of the American Pharmaceutical Association  (1996 –  2002); it obtained   its current title in 2003, and is the official journal of the American Pharmacists Association  (the scientific journal of the association is the Journal of Pharmaceutical Sciences).  The current editor-in-chief is Pamela Heaton, PhD, BSPharm, MS (University of Cincinnati).

Abstracting and indexing
The journal is abstracted and indexed in:
 Biological Abstracts
 Chemical Abstracts 
 Excerpta Medica
 FDA Clinical Experience Abstracts
 Index Medicus/MEDLINE/PubMed
 Science Citation Index Expanded
 Current Contents/Clinical Medicine
According to the Journal Citation Reports, the journal has a 2018 impact factor of 2.076.

References

External links 
 

Publications established in 1961
Pharmacology journals
Bimonthly journals
Academic journals published by learned and professional societies of the United States
English-language journals